The Capital City Service (CCS) is a Scottish football hooligan firm associated with Hibernian F.C. and active from 1984 when the casual hooligan subculture took off in Scotland. Their roots were in the previous incarnations of hooligan groups attached to the club and also the wider Edinburgh and surrounding area's gang culture. They are more commonly known in the media and amongst the public as the Hibs Casuals, although within the hooligan network they may also be referred to as Hibs Boys.

Hooliganism was established at matches with many clubs in Scottish football before the advent of the casuals and violence from Hibernian supporters was recognised as likely to occur by other teams' hooligan supporters. The CCS went on to be regarded by some rivals and observers as the dominant hooligan gang in the Scottish scene from the latter part of the 1980s until the mid-1990s and also from outside Scotland as one of the best from north of the border.

During the latter part of the 1990s, a split in their ranks caused by the formation of a nationwide hooligan firm made up of casuals from different teams and a general decline in football hooliganism in Scotland saw activity of the gang diminish. However, by the early part of the next decade an apparent resurgence in football hooliganism at various clubs in Scotland was being observed by authorities and the CCS attached to Hibernian were involved

Formation
In the early 1980s, Hibs away fixtures were regularly attended by fans travelling on supporters' buses from amongst areas in Edinburgh such as Leith, Niddrie, Tollcross and Granton. This afforded the opportunity for bonds to be forged through the shared experiences of following the team and responding to the actions of opposing fans. An away match in November 1983 against Airdrie resulted in a clash with the well-known local hooligans, Section B, which further strengthened these connections and helped bolster the young Hibs boys confidence into forming a casual-style hooligan firm. This new friendship of youths from different areas of the city was a contrast to the existing area gang ethos that had been a feature of the capital since the 1950s. The camaraderie branched out from match days as the gang members also hung about with each other during the week. Word soon got round and the basis of the first known unified Edinburgh gang was in place.

Edinburgh at that time had become known as the AIDS capital of Europe due to the rampant heroin use that existed there. Coupled with the ongoing poor economic climate throughout the country, for young men who wished to maintain pride in themselves as well as a sense of belonging to something the new casual hooligan culture was an alternative route to embark upon.

However, the congeniality was not a constant throughout the rest of the Hibs support who, in the main, still wore team colours at matches. Referred to as scarfers, or more playfully as cavemen by the Hibs boys, a popular chant at the time that was adopted by some Hibs scarfers was Oh it's magic, you know, Hi-bees and casuals don't go and this dislike between the CCS and other sections of the Hibs crowd was tangible at home matches.

A pivotal moment in this formative season was when the CCS encountered the leading casual gang at the time in Scotland - the Aberdeen Soccer Casuals - before a Hibernian v. Aberdeen game in Edinburgh. The two mobs clashed on Easter Road and after some fighting the CCS ran away, but one Hibs boy got severely beaten and was in a coma for a week. Rather than deter them, this near-tragedy emboldened the fledgling gang to continue with their efforts in being casual hooligans. At the next Hibs match, against local rivals Hearts at Tynecastle, the CCS fared a lot better when they came up against the notorious Gorgie Aggro. This also proved to be a turning point in the Edinburgh football hooligan scene.

Structure within the gang

As the CCS evolved an informal hierarchy appeared but there was no singular leader or 'top boy' as was usual for other crews. Instead, a committee of five individuals who had garnered enough respect amongst their peers took to the task of planning and organising for the gang's activities at football. By the early to mid-1990s this system had expired and was replaced mainly by two protagonists who arranged most battles and who were also striving for control of the mob.

Membership wasn't even restricted to only Hibs fans. Over the years casuals from Hearts and sometimes Old Firm fans who lived in Edinburgh were integrated into the mob. These individuals usually had a more rigorous initiation than normal as asides from the reservations of some CCS members they also had to prove their worth against the team that they were originally associated with.

There was also the need initially for hooligans younger than ones in the main mob to form their own identifiable group and could also be managed and trained by older more experienced hooligans. In later times a type of apprenticeship scheme was used to enable the veterans in the CCS to select and mentor prospective younger hooligans.
Eventually some offspring of Hibs casuals took to being the new younger additions to the Hibs mob. This father-to-son tradition also occurred with other mobs as was exampled in action when sons from the CCS and CSF were involved in an altercation outside an entertainment complex in Edinburgh.

The following is a list of elements of the CCS that are recognised internally by the gang as well as outside parties.

Blackleys Baby Crew (BBC) - Formed in 1985 mainly by the younger siblings and associates of the original members. Named after the manager of the football club at the time, John Blackley. This group was dissolved once its prolific members attained full acceptance by the main mob.

Lassie Soccer Trendies (LST) - Females who were either girlfriends or groupies of CCS members. The older or more male only gang purists amongst the CCS were often embarrassed by the existence of this set of wanna-be gang members. Despite these reservations this group flourished and was never really dropped completely until 1988, though by then the women involved in it had taken on a more jocular approach to what they had participated in.

The Family - In 1986 a hardcore section of the gang wanted to create a specific identity for the most dedicated and enthusiastic members. The nomenclature of CCS was felt by the participants to be the generic title for all casual hooligans who had attached themselves to Hibernian regardless of the individuals capabilities or reputation.

Hibs Baby Crew (HBC) - Circa 1987 the popularity of football hooliganism and of the CCS activities had attracted another set of young and eager recruits in much the same way as the previous baby crew. The dissolution of this group followed the same pattern as the BBC. By the early part of the 21st century there was a further wave of casual styled hooligans attached to Hibernian who had resurrected the moniker of the Hibs Baby Crew. This consisted of youths attracted to football hooliganism for similar reasons as their predecessors and quite often enough they could have been sons or nephews of older hooligans.

Strategies and tactics

A concerted effort was made to apply some strategic thinking to the CCS activity at the football.  In readiness to face other hooligan gangs a formation was opted for that consisted of a front line of around twenty self-proclaimed "nutters" who initiated the confrontation with their rivals and directly behind them were other enthusiastic battle lines ready to support the attack.

Whenever possible they tried to ambush another crew and strike them at the weakest point which was usually in the middle of their mob, the perception being that this section contained few if any of their adversaries' more competent fighters. This tended to make an easier job of splitting up the other mob and dispatching their less robust members quickly.
If the opposing gang were in a police escort then a group of Hibs boys made their way to the front of it while another group would hang around at the back. The bunch at the front would act as a decoy and start causing trouble in an attempt to lure all the police officers to rush in and assist their colleagues. This left the area at the back of the opposition firm open to attack by the expectant Hibs mob positioned there.

On match days in Edinburgh a favoured gathering place would be the Penny Black pub on West Register Street situated near to Waverley station just off the east end of Princes Street. This back-street public house, and the convenience of a café and betting office below it, kept the Hibs boys out of the eyes of police in the days before adequate CCTV coverage of the city centre. Members of the Baby Crew would be positioned with a line of sight on the exits from the station to enable them to determine what potential route visiting soccer crews would take and likely points where to confront the opposition. Likewise, after games had finished the city centre bars were sometimes used as the last opportunity to engage with their rivals as they made their way back to the railway station.

Nearer to the stadium the CCS would frequent pubs such as the Thistle Bar, Albion Bar and the Royal Nip, which was considered by many Hibs boys as their spiritual home. Often though the CCS would head to the Ladbrokes bookmakers that was situated on Easter Road at the junction with Bothwell Street to hang around the premises and wait for their moment of opportunity to take on other firms. It was here that visiting fans were finally marshalled away from the accessible public area and either directed to or escorted to their allocated section of the ground.

As the segregation techniques used by the police to escort fans to the game became more effective whenever the opportunity arose for the Hibs casuals they would enter into the section of the ground allocated for away fans. Often Hibs boys would leave the ground before the match had finished while avoiding police attention to try to position themselves better to launch attacks on the opposition. The pubs were usually closed on Easter Road at this time so the side streets that lead onto it or the cover of the bushes and trees on London Road Gardens would be used in attempts to initiate gang fights. It has also been known for Hibs boys to mooch around the A & E department of the Edinburgh hospital looking for their victims and associates from earlier on in the day.

For away matches the favoured mode of transport in the first few years was on the scheduled train services from either Waverley or Haymarket stations. Word of mouth was the usual method of relaying to gang members of the where and when to meet though in the 1984/85 season the section in the local evening paper put aside for football fans travelling into and out of Edinburgh was also used on occasion. In later seasons the information for the meeting point was often communicated by the use of party invitation cards that detailed the venue and time. The railway network provided convenient access to the requisite city or town centre and from there the CCS would walk to the football stadium regardless of distance. This would allow the Hibs boys to be on show for any rival crews along the way to have the opportunity to interact with them.

To try to overcome the hurdle of effective policing of football match days in other cities the idea came about of arriving early enough to avoid detection and the subsequent police escort. Within the space of a fortnight in December 1986 the Hibs casuals twice met and took early trains to their destination enabling them to arrive well before noon. This was early enough to catch the police off-guard in Aberdeen when they arrived at 10.30 a.m. but in Dundee two weeks later the police were soon alerted to their mid-morning arrival.
Similarly, as with games at Easter Road the CCS would gain entry to the opposition's end whenever possible, although this time it meant entering the part of the ground designated for the home supporters, such as against Celtic and St. Mirren.
 
When the casual presence at Scottish football was eventually acknowledged by the authorities the hooligans travelling in this manner became easier targets for the police to intercept and contain. Sometimes it was necessary to make use of scheduled express coach service routes, hired coaches, rented or privately owned vehicles like cars, mini-buses and transit vans to circumvent anticipated police measures in place around main railway stations and city centres.

For some away fixtures it was important to carry out a pre-matchday recce at the football ground the game was to be played at in order to scheme for a specific ploy to be carried out successfully. This would entail attending a match between their future opponents and another club to be able to ascertain what options would be made available to them to enact their plan.  At a game to be played at Ibrox in the late 1980s the idea was to smuggle in a set of pyrotechnics so the gang needed to know beforehand what the search procedure was likely to be. At a match at Parkhead the following season the Hibs boys were planning to attack the Celtic casuals inside the stadium so needed to be up to speed as to where the CSC assembled at that time. A friendly fixture against the south London side Millwall in 1990 threw up a completely new challenge of getting to know the lay-out of the area where the game was to be played, transport links and crucially, where the opposition mob's favoured pubs would be.

From the mid 1990s onwards police intelligence efforts and the effective use of closed-circuit television cameras impinged upon these methods of initiating gang fights so meetings via mobile phones became the preferred means to make arrangements with rival mobs. The internet has also claimed to have been utilised in such a way to co-ordinate football related disorder.

If practicable, the venue for the brawl to take place had to be sufficiently far away from the anticipated area of police surveillance on the day. For example, during the 1994/95 season, for a visit of Dundee hooligans, it was a public house in a quiet white collar part of the New Town area and against the Rangers mob it was at a suburban railway station in Slateford, which was regarded as deep within Hearts fans territory. For the 1996 Euro Championship game between England and Scotland a pub with a suitably sized car park for a mob fight was opted for in the London area of High Barnet, ten miles away from the usual battleground of Trafalgar Square. This mode of confrontation was still evident in 2011 for a match against Celtic in Edinburgh but with the added twist of taking place while the game was being played three miles away from the fight.

Another approach employed to evade police observation involved meeting representatives of an opposing gang the day before a match and showing them a route and pub to congregate in that could avoid CCTV detection. An illustration of this occurred prior to a pre-season friendly at Easter Road Stadium against Leeds United in 2004.

Disorder at football

The CCS has had clashes all across Scotland, England and Europe either when Hibernian or Scotland were playing or as invited guests of other English hooligan firms at various English league games. There have been instances of them making an appearance at Scottish or English club matches without the prior knowledge of the hooligan element of the teams playing each other that day.

Pre-season friendlies that were played against English clubs such as Newcastle United, Oldham Athletic, Burnley, Aston Villa, Millwall, Leeds United, Preston North End, Sunderland, Bolton Wanderers and Nottingham Forest have also led to hooligan incidents. One friendly at home that had been arranged with Chelsea in the early 1990s had potentially serious trouble averted by police action against a travelling group of well known Chelsea hooligans.

In the brief appearances the club has made in European competitions since the inception of the gang there has also been incidents of note against FC Liege, Anderlecht, Dnipro Dnipropetrovsk and Maribor.

For Scotland national team games they were most active when they played England on either side of the border but were also heavily involved for a match against the Netherlands in Utrecht in the mid-1990s.

Other law & order issues

Over the years accusations of a range of criminal activity not linked to football has been levelled towards the CCS as a whole as well as individuals within it. The police have been quoted in the Scottish press as stating the gang (or its members) have carried out or are responsible for organising armed robberies, shoplifting sprees, street muggings, housebreakings, protection rackets, extortionism, drug dealing and murders as well as continuous public order offences around night life in pubs and clubs. This led to their inclusion in a Home Office Affairs Committee investigation into football hooligan gangs activity in the UK in the early 1990s.

Club in crisis

After mismanagement during the late 1980s, Hibernian were on the brink of financial ruin in 1990 and in June of that year, Wallace Mercer, the chairman of Edinburgh derby rivals Hearts, proposed a merger of the two clubs. The Hibs fans believed that the proposal was little more than a hostile takeover and they formed the Hands off Hibs group to campaign for the continued existence of the club.

Although the CCS were never accepted by the club as real fans and despite the antipathy often shown towards them from other Hibs supporters, the gang were also opposed to this threat to the club's future. The CCS launched a graffiti campaign aimed directly at the Hearts chairman as well as issuing threats via the media and in letters and telephone calls to Tynecastle. One group of Hibs casuals went to Mercer's Edinburgh suburban home with the intention to confront him directly but upon realising he wasn't there they painted slogans on his house such as 'Mercer is dead' and 'Long Live Hibs'. Police with dogs were soon guarding his home as windows at his business properties were also smashed and bullets were being sent to him in the post. The Hands off Hibs committee quickly disassociated themselves from the vandalism and threatening behaviour.

The 'Mercer' derby

The first match to be played between the clubs after the failed takeover bid was at Easter Road the following September and in anticipation of trouble the police cancelled weekend leave and drafted in extra officers from outside Edinburgh. This decision was vindicated as this emotionally charged game was played in what was described as a volatile atmosphere. On the section of the east terracing next to the Dunbar end there were outbreaks of disorder throughout the first half, including incursions onto the playing field that caused the game to be halted and players' leaving the pitch until order was restored. During the interval there was more trouble on the terracing and fans again encroached onto the touchlines which delayed the start of the second half of the match. The police entered the Hearts dressing room during half-time and made a plea with them not to score any more goals as there was a real threat of a full pitch invasion by Hibs fans. Police later revealed that half of the arrests made at the game were of Hibs casuals.

Splinter group

By the late 1990s a split within the gang led to some members creating a Scottish National Firm (SNF), made up of hooligans from other clubs in the country and also included hooligans from traditionally hated clubs such as Hearts, Airdrie and Rangers. The SNF was unreservedly right wing in its political motivations, and there was media suggestions that it had been encouraged by groups such as the British National Party. The intention of this new mob was to cause trouble at any game they appeared at, regardless of who was playing, either in Scotland, England or abroad, such as during the 1998 World Cup in France. This gang existed for only a short time and when it was disbanded the CCS members of it went on to become a significant part of the Manchester United superfirm the Men in Black. According to Manchester United hooligan Colin Blaney the Men in Black's trend of wearing black clothing was inspired by Hibs, who did this as a means of avoiding being recognized by the police.

Football hooliganism research

They were also the subject or included in several social anthropological studies by academia in the UK.

In popular culture
By 2005 the Scottish Football Museum at Hampden Park had in its popular culture section a display case that contained a pair of Adidas training shoes and a sweater worn by a Hibs casual in the 1980s.

Literature
The author Irvine Welsh has included many references to the gang in his works with the most noted being the eponymous story in The Acid House collection and the novel Marabou Stork Nightmares. In The Acid House Coco Bryce is a Hibs boy who while tripping on LSD is struck by lightning which also strikes an ambulance containing a woman in the process of giving birth. He is transplanted into the baby's body in which later on he contrives a meet-up with the CCS in a pub prior to a Hibernian match. Marabou Stork Nightmares is a tale related through the perspective of Roy Strang who is in a comatose state. He was a frontline participant of the CCS and the story relays confrontations between them and other mobs as well as Roy's personal discourse on what it was like to be a Hibs casual. There are references to other fictional Hibs casuals and events in Filth, Glue, Porno, Reheated Cabbage and Skagboys.

For the film adaptation of The Acid House in 1998 directed by Paul McGuigan a Hibs boy was involved in assisting on wardrobe and providing some bona fida Hibs casuals as extras for the final scene in the pub. Some clothing suggested for the scene and also the use of club colours were rejected by the Hibs boys as they would deem the portrayal of casuals as being non-authentic. During filming the director requested that the Hibs boys sing some CCS songs and chants and they complied much to his approval.

Decade by Pat W. Henderson is a novel about Scottish criminals set in the rave music scene of the early 1990s. It touches upon the football hooliganism around that time and the Hibs casuals make an appearance as they attack Houlihans bar in Dundee to take on the Utility.

The Scots actor-writer Ruaraidh Murray based his one-man show Big Sean, Mikey and me around his life in Edinburgh during the 1980s and 1990s, his close friendship with a renowned Hibs casual and includes their encounters with other casual gangs. He first performed this at the Gilded Balloon during the Edinburgh Festival Fringe of 2012 and is currently adapting the stage script of it for a radio and film production.

Documentary, Television and Cinema

In June 1989 the Radio Forth documentary magazine Forth File aired its interviews with six members of the CCS, Jim Gray Managing Director of Hibernian F.C., Alistair Darling MP, Superintendent Tom Wood of Lothian & Borders police and Bert Moorhouse a senior lecturer at Glasgow University. The shows presenter Andrew Glover declared that the gang were planning a campaign of terror in Europe in the approaching football season and coined the phrase "A nightmare in Europe part 1". The Hibs casuals talked about why they were hooligans and also about the prospect of entering the upcoming UEFA Cup. One hooligan was quoted as saying that "We'll be doing it for Hibs, for pride of the club, for pride of Edinburgh".

The Trouble on the Terraces documentary released in 1994 on VHS format looked at football hooliganism in the UK and on the European continent prior to the Euro 96 tournament. Some Hibs boys were among the interviewees while they were in Amsterdam before the friendly international fixture between the Netherlands and Scotland.

Sky Sports Soccer AM team unwittingly accepted a request from one of the CCS for a chance to represent Hibernian in the shows Fans of the week feature and seven of them were invited to appear on the 2 September 2000 broadcast. The Hibs boys travelled to London on the Friday and their evening was spent drinking, while some were smoking cannabis as well, as they recounted hooligan tales from the past which ran into the wee small hours. So it was a shabby looking bunch that were mostly still blatantly in an alcoholic haze who shuffled onto the mini-bus bound for the studios at 6 a.m. the next morning. While in the dressing room as one of the production assistants was handing out the white Hibernian away jerseys provided by the club they noticed that the Hibs casuals were wearing t-shirts with hooligan slogans on them and instructed them that during the show not to make any noise until prompted and on no account should they reveal their CCS shirts while on air. Also, both of the shows presenters at the time, Tim Lovejoy and Helen Chamberlain, went into the room and reiterated the instructions regarding behaviour with the latter revealing the Torquay United tattoo on her posterior upon request from the still inebriated Scotsmen. When the show started and they were introduced the Hibs boys burst into chants of CCS, CCS and one of them danced in front of the camera and instantly revealed his These Colours Don't Run t-shirt with further sporadic outbursts similar to this throughout the show. Their antics were picked up by the News of the World and the next day they ran a story highlighting that Scotland's most notorious hooligan gang had tricked their way onto the show.

BBC Scotland's investigative current affairs programme Frontline Scotland broadcast in 2004 its report Policing the casuals on the rise of football hooliganism in the country and the legislation proposed by Scottish police forces dealing with it. Included in the show was coverage of how the police dealt with a Category A match involving Hibernian away to Hearts in October of that year and the casual gangs associated with both clubs.

In 2006 the documentary series The Real Football Factories created by Zig Zag Productions was shown on the Bravo TV channel which looked at football hooligans and firms throughout the UK. The episode that focused on Scottish hooligans included a segment on the CCS and there were interviews with two of its former members as well as a journalist who had reported on them during the emergence of Scottish casuals in the mid 1980s.

Music
Rave music, Madchester and baggy scenes were all touched upon by CCS in some way. In Edinburgh Hibs boys ran dance clubs like Bubble Funk or organised other musical promotion events in venues such as the Calton Studios.

At an Inspiral Carpets gig played in Edinburgh some Hibs boys clashed with their roadies who were chanting the name of Manchester City's firm the Guvnors. Another band from Greater Manchester Northside played at the Calton Studios to a crowd mainly of Hibs casuals and students. Their lead singer Warren "Dermo" Dermody pleased a section of the audience by wearing a These Colours Don't Run t-shirt during their show. The Shamen also performed at this venue and towards the end of their set a Hibs boy climbed onto the stage and started dancing, As the security went to remove him Will Synott of the band stopped them by saying just let the guy dance. The intoxicated casual then commandeered a microphone and while holding his Burberry scarf aloft he burst into a rendition of Move Any Mountain.  Will Synott fell over as he now went to intervene and as the security tried to assist he fell off the stage and the concert ended prematurely.

Influenced by these music scenes a local Edinburgh band was formed called the Guitar Casuals, one of whom was a Hibs boy. Trouble frequently occurred wherever they played and they were ultimately banned from most of the live venues in the city.

Fashion
By the late 1990s a leading Hibs casual had opened a clothes shop on South Clerk Street in Edinburgh called Original Casuals.

Fashion designer and owner of Norton & Sons bespoke tailors Patrick Grant has stated that it was his encounters with Hibs casuals in his formative years that aroused his interest in fashion.

See also
 Casual (subculture)
 List of hooligan firms

References

Bibliography
 

 
 
 
 
 

 

 
 
 
 
 
 
 
 
 
 
 
 
 
 

 
 
 
 
 
 
 
 

Hibernian F.C.
British football hooligan firms
History of Edinburgh
Gangs in Scotland
1980s in Edinburgh
1990s in Edinburgh
1980s establishments in Scotland